A singing telegram is a message that is delivered by an artist in a musical form.  Singing telegrams are historically linked to normal telegrams, but tend to be humorous. Sometimes the artist is in costume or formal clothing.

Western Union, the American telegraph company began offering singing telegram services in 1933. That July 28, a fan sent Hollywood singing star Rudy Vallee a birthday greeting by telegram. George P. Oslin (1899–1996), the Western Union public relations director, decided this would be a good opportunity to make telegrams, which had been associated with deaths and other tragic news, into something more popular.  He asked a Western Union operator, Lucille Lipps, to sing the message over the telephone, and this became the first singing telegram. While Oslin created the singing telegram because he thought "that messages should be fun," he recalled that he "was angrily informed I was making a laughingstock of the company."

As relatively few telegram recipients had telephones, most telegrams, including singing telegrams, were first delivered in person. The popularization of the telephone in the 1960s reduced telegrams in general. By 1972, Western Union was receiving a small number of requests for singing telegrams and was seeking regulatory approval on a state-by-state basis to eliminate the offering. Western Union suspended its singing telegram service in 1974, but independent singing telegram companies, specializing in often costumed personal delivery of gift messages, have kept up the tradition.

Variants
A DIY singing telegram is a specially written song all about the person in karaoke DVD form, so that any singer anywhere in the world can deliver the fully personalised singing telegram.

Kissogram
A kissogram, also called kissagram (short for kissing telegram), is a message delivered along with a kiss, usually arranged as a fun surprise for a person for a special occasion. Message deliverers can be hired either by themselves, or as part of an agency. A kissogram is usually presented by a performer dressed in a costume or uniform such as a police officer, nurse, french maid or nun. This term was used in the TV program Doctor Who during the early 2010s to describe the profession of The Doctor's companion Amy Pond.

Stripogram
A stripogram or strippergram is a form of message delivery in which a stripper will perform a striptease while singing or dancing. This type of entertainment became popular in the 1970s in the US and spread to the UK and Europe during the 1980s. Typically a Strip-O-Gram is most often a form of gift given for a birthday, anniversary or bachelor party. A common practice is for the stripper-gram to be dressed in an outfit of one kind or another and to act out some charade connected with this, before commencing their actfor example a police officer 'arresting' somebody, a lawyer pretending to serve papers, a jilted bride and so on (sometimes this charade will be relevant to something the intended 'victim' has experienced, such as a divorce, or brush with the law). Usually a Strip-o-gram entertainer is accompanied by a chaperone, who plays her music, holds on to the money, tips and secures her safety. Unlike an escort who comes alone and does more of a one on one with the celebrant and is not chaperoned. Nowadays some agencies or performers do both to secure a bigger pay out.

See also
 Gorillagram
 Telegram

References

External links
 Singing Telegrams Deliver Messages with a Melody Voice of America, 27 July 2005
 George P. Oslin

Entertainment
Oral communication
Western Union